Moritz Brasch (18 August 1843 in Zempelburg, Prussia, now Sępólno Krajeńskie – 14 September 1895 in Leipzig) was a German philosopher and man of letters.

He was educated at the universities of Berlin, Greifswald, and Jena, settling at Berlin on the completion of his studies. Finally he went to Leipzig, where he became (1874–79) the chief editor of the Brockhaus Konversations-Lexikon.

Brasch ranked high among German essayists. He published the following works:

"Benedictus von Spinoza's System der Philosophie," 1870
"Lichtstrahlen aus Mendelssohn's Schriften nach der Ethica Dargestellt," 1875
"Die Klassiker der Philosophie," 3 vols. 1883-86
"Gesammelte Essays und Charakterköpfe zur Neuern Philosophie und Litteratur," 2 vols. 1885-86
"Philosophie der Gegenwart" (vol. iv. of "Klassiker der Philosophie"), 1887
"Welt-und Lebensanschauung Friedrich Uberwegs," 1888
"Philosophie und Politik: Studien über Lassalle und Johann Jacoby," 1890
"Gesch. der Leipziger Universität von ihrem Ursprung bis zur Gegenwart," 1890
"Lehrbuch der Gesch. der Philosophie," 2d ed. 1893
"Wesen und Ziele der Ethischen Bewegung," 1894
"Leipziger Philosophen im 19. Jahrhundert—Porträts und Studien," 1894
"Die Facultätenfrage und die Stellung der Philosophie," 1895.

He edited: 
Moses Mendelssohn's "Werke zur Metaphysik, Religionsphilosophie und Aesthetik," 2 vols. 1880, 2d ed. 1881
Friedrich Ueberweg's "Schiller als Philosoph und Historiker," 1885; Schopenhauer's works, 2 vols., 1891
Aristotle's "Politeia" (German transl. with introduction and notes), 1894.

References
Leipziger Illustrirte Zeitung, Aug. 16, 1890; 
Kohut, Berühmte Israelitische Männer und Frauen, part 14, p. 212; 
De Gubernatis, Diz. Biog.

External links 
  (Online)

1843 births
1895 deaths
19th-century essayists
19th-century German Jews
19th-century German male writers
19th-century German writers
19th-century German non-fiction writers
19th-century German philosophers
19th-century German historians
19th-century translators
Commentators on Aristotle
Epistemologists
German editors
German ethicists
German male essayists
German male non-fiction writers
German male writers
German translators
Humboldt University of Berlin alumni
Jewish philosophers
Jewish German writers
Metaphysicians
Ontologists
People from Sępólno Krajeńskie
People from the Province of Prussia
Philosophers of art
Philosophers of culture
Philosophers of education
Philosophers of history
Philosophers of literature
Philosophers of religion
Philosophers of social science
Philosophy academics
Philosophy writers
Political philosophers
Social philosophers
Spinoza scholars
University of Greifswald alumni
University of Jena alumni